Stewart Walker is a music producer.

Stewart Walker may also refer to:

A. Stewart Walker, architect
Stewart–Walker lemma

See also

Stuart Walker (disambiguation)